Capoeta turani, the Seyhan scraper, is a Turkish species of cyprinid fish in the genus Capoeta. This fish, which grows up to 15 cm long, only lives in the Seyhan River drainage, and is only known from two localities, one of which is a reservoir.  Nevertheless, it is locally quite abundant, and the population appears stable.

References 

Turani
Endemic fauna of Turkey
Fish described in 2008
Taxa named by Müfit Özuluǧ
Taxa named by Jörg Freyhof